The Party Tour was the seventh concert tour by American singer Chris Brown. The tour only visited the United States, with Brown performing over 30 concerts during the spring of 2017. It is reported the tour earned $18.7 million.

Background
Following the cancellation of his boxing match against rapper Soulja Boy, the tour was officially announced by Brown in February 2017 through his Instagram account.

Like his previous tour, the bill featured numerous artists in the hip hop scene, including 50 Cent, O.T. Genasis, Kap G, Fabolous, Casanova and French Montana. While Montana was on the initial roster, his name was later removed when the tour was officially announced. 50 Cent dropped out of the tour last minute. Many media outlets reported disagreements with production as the reason for the cancellation. The rapper claimed his contract was never finalized and he was still filming a movie during the time of the tour. Other artists that appeared on singular dates of the tour were Usher and Future. While on tour the singer was working on his eighth studio album Heartbreak on a Full Moon, already having released three singles off of it, "Grass Ain't Greener", "Party", with this tour being named after it, and "Privacy", that were performed to promote the upcoming release of the project.

Critical reception

The tour received mixed to positive reviews from critics. Nathan Paige (The Plain Dealer) writes the show in Cleveland did a good job of showcasing his talents. He continues: "Even though Brown's stint in Cleveland was solely to showcase his talents and appease his fans, it's difficult to write an objective review without thinking of some of his unfavorable behavior in recent years. Brown's fans either love him despite his flaws, or used to love him, and no longer support his music. By the time he took the stage, The Q was nearly full - a sign that this talented singer/dancer/actor still has a strong fan base in Ohio".

Ross Raihala of the St. Paul Pioneer Press stated: "The sparse, wide-open stage served as a screen and showed various graphics timed to the beats and sometimes footage from Brown’s videos, like the racy “Privacy.” Given all the flashing lights and booming bass, though, Brown did sometimes seem to get lost at his own party. There were some fun moments for sure, particularly “Time for Love” and “Ayo”. Chris Riemenschneider (Star Tribune) shared the thoughts on the concert in Saint Paul. He says: "Brown's performance was still far from comeback-level. His voice has plenty of velvety power left in it, as he proved early on in a dramatic 'Deuces,' and he still shows traces of Michael Jackson in his stylish dance moves, which he reiterated in the show finale, 'Party'. [...] Brown stopped and started a lot for outfit changes, and the momentum never really got going.".

For the show in Lincoln, L. Keny Wolgamott of the Lincoln Journal Star wrote: "They put on a high energy show with some good tricks -- starting with Brown's entrance from underneath the video cube above the center of the stage, flipping around on some wires before he hit the stage".

Opening acts
O.T. Genasis
Kap G
Casanova
Ayo & Teo

Support acts
DC Young Fly 
Fabolous

Setlist

The following setlist was obtained from the concert held on March 31, 2017, at the Royal Farms Arena in Baltimore, Maryland. It does not represent every concert for the duration of the tour.
"Wrist"
"Poppin'"
"Love More"
"Yo (Excuse Me Miss)"
"Deuces"
"Picture Me Rollin'"
"Privacy"
"She Wildin'" 
"Liquor"
"Drunk Texting"
"Grass Ain't Greener"
"Take You Down"
"Make Love"
"Back to Sleep"
"Wishing"
"Do You Mind"
"Time for Love"
"Show Me" / "Post to Be" / Ayo
"Loyal"
Encore
"Kriss Kross"
"Party"

Tour dates

Box office score data

References 

2017 concert tours
Chris Brown